The voiceless or more precisely tenuis palatal click is a click consonant found primarily among the languages of southern Africa. , a double-barred esh).

Features
Features of the tenuis palatal click:

Occurrence
Tenuis palatal clicks are only found in the various Khoisan language families of southern Africa and in the neighboring Yeyi language.

References

Click consonants
Palatal consonants
Oral consonants
Central consonants
Tenuis consonants